Bring the Funny is an American comedy competition series that aired on NBC from July 9 to September 17, 2019.

Hosted by comedian Amanda Seales, the series features various comedy acts performing in front of an audience for a chance to win $250,000. The first season consisted of 11 episodes: 10 regular episodes and an additional results episode for the finale. The series's panel of judges consists of Kenan Thompson, Chrissy Teigen and Jeff Foxworthy.

Open Mic
The Open Mic round featured 40 contestants appearing over four episodes, with 10 acts per episode. The judges selected six out of the 10 acts in each episode to move onto the next round, the Comedy Clash; the other four acts were eliminated.

Week 1

Week 2

Week 3

Week 4

Comedy Clash
The Comedy Clash features all 24 selected acts and pits them against each other. The Judges then vote on who advances to the Showcase (twelve move on, twelve are eliminated).

Week 5

Week 6

Week 7

Semi-final Showcase
The semi-final Showcase features the remaining 12 selected acts as voted by the judges. The judges will choose 2 acts from each week to move on to the finale, with the viewers choosing one act to advance to the finale as a wildcard. 7 will be Eliminated.

Week 8

Week 9

Finale
The finale began by revealing The Valleyfolk got the most votes from the viewers, and they return to the competition. After the episode ends, the viewers then vote on the five acts to decide who brought the funny. The winner of Bring the Funny’s first season will be revealed in a results episode the following week. Three will finish as finalists, and the winner will be announced by Amanda.

Week 10

Elimination table

Episodes

Ratings

See also
Last Comic Standing, a similar show

References

External links
 

2010s American reality television series
2019 American television series debuts
2019 American television series endings
NBC original programming
English-language television shows
Television series by Universal Television
Talent shows
Just for Laughs